Neuropathia mucinosa cutanea is a cutaneous condition characterized by livedo reticularis on the legs and hyperesthesia.

See also 
 Nodular lichen myxedematosus
 List of cutaneous conditions

References 

Mucinoses